Duncan McKenzie (10 August 1912 – 1987) was a Scottish professional footballer who made over 150 appearances in the Football League for Brentford as a right half. He was capped by Scotland at international level.

Career

Albion Rovers 
A centre half, McKenzie began his career at Scottish Second Division club Albion Rovers. He was an ever-present for Rovers during the 1931–32 season and departed the club at the end of the campaign.

Brentford 
McKenzie moved to England and signed for Third Division South club Brentford for a £350 fee during the 1932 off-season. His career at Griffin Park started slowly and he made just two appearances during the 1932–33 Third Division South title-winning season and then only 12 during the following season in the Second Division. After moving to the right half position, McKenzie broke into the team during the 1934–35 season, making 31 appearances and picking up the first silverware of his career when the Bees won promotion to the First Division as Second Division champions. He made regular appearances in Brentford's first spell in the top flight, before new signing Buster Brown in 1938 caused McKenzie to ask for a transfer. McKenzie made 161 appearances and scored 10 goals during his six years with the Bees.

Middlesbrough 
McKenzie transferred to First Division club Middlesbrough in May 1938 for a £6,000 fee. He made 28 appearances before his professional career was ended by the breakout of the Second World War the following year.

Return to Brentford 
McKenzie returned to Brentford as a guest during the Second World War and made over 150 appearances. The highlight of his time back at Griffin Park was winning the 1942 London War Cup at Wembley Stadium.

International career 
McKenzie's form in the First Division for Brentford led to a call up to the Scotland national team for a British Home Championship match versus Ireland on 10 November 1937. Included in the lineup with Brentford teammate and fellow debutant Bobby Reid, McKenzie helped the Scots to a 1–1 draw at Pittodrie.

Personal life 
After the war, McKenzie emigrated to the US and lived in San Diego. McKenzie's nephew Hamish was also a professional footballer and followed in his footsteps by signing for Brentford in 1964.

Honours 
Brentford
Football League Second Division: 1934–35
 London War Cup: 1941–42

Career statistics

References

Date of death missing
Footballers from Glasgow
Scottish footballers
Brentford F.C. players
English Football League players
1912 births
Albion Rovers F.C. players
Scottish Football League players
Association football wing halves
Middlesbrough F.C. players
Scottish emigrants to the United States
Brentford F.C. wartime guest players
Scotland international footballers
1987 deaths
Place of death missing